Albert Mwombeki Edward (born 19 November 1991) is a Tanzanian-born-Australian professional soccer player who played as a defender for Wilmington Hammerheads in the USL Pro.

Career

Early career
Edward played four years of college soccer at Lindsey Wilson College between 2010 and 2013.

While at college, Edward appeared for USL PDL club's Nashville Metros, River City Rovers and Des Moines Menace.

Professional
On 21 January 2014 Edward was drafted in the fourth round (68th overall) of the 2014 MLS SuperDraft by Colorado Rapids. However, he was not signed by the club.

Edward signed with USL Pro club Wilmington Hammerheads on 30 May 2014.

References

External links 

1991 births
Living people
Australian soccer players
Australian expatriate soccer players
Lindsey Wilson Blue Raiders men's soccer players
Nashville Metros players
Derby City Rovers players
Des Moines Menace players
Wilmington Hammerheads FC players
Association football defenders
Expatriate soccer players in the United States
Colorado Rapids draft picks
USL Championship players
USL League Two players